The Cayman Islands national rugby union team represents the Cayman Islands  in the sport of rugby union. They have thus far not qualified for a Rugby World Cup, but have participated in qualifying tournaments. The sport in the Cayman Islands is governed by the Cayman Rugby Union. The Cayman Islands have players throughout the squad playing through the UK, Ireland, South Africa, Canada and the USA.

As of 2019, the Cayman Islands competes in the Rugby Americas Challenge along with Columbia, Mexico and Paraguay. In 2019 they were crowned champions of the Caribbean after representing the Northern Caribbean region and beating Guyana (who were the champions of the Southern region) by 58 to 14 on 9 February 2019. The Cayman Islands will be the fourth team to qualify for the Americas Rugby Challenge which will be held later in the Summer of 2019.

Their shirts are dark blue, with a single 2 white hoops and red stripe across the shoulder.

History
The Cayman Islands played Mexico in 1985 in Mexico City, defeating them 22 points to 18. There were also a number of games played in 1999 in Georgetown against other nations such as Bermuda and the Bahamas. The team played a match against Mexico in 2001, which they won 20 to 14.

The Cayman Islands attempted to qualify for the 2003 Rugby World Cup in Australia, taking part in the Americas qualifying tournaments during 2001. In their first match they defeated Guyana, but were then knocked out of qualification after losing to Trinidad and Tobago.

In 2005 they attempted to qualify for the 2007 Rugby World Cup in France, and started their campaign in the North Pool of Round 1a of the qualifying tournaments, alongside the Bahamas, Jamaica and Bermuda. They however finished second in the pool, behind the Bahamas, winning two of their three fixtures.

In 2018, the Cayman Islands signed a multi-year kit deal with international apparel brand Scimitar Sportswear.

Recent games
 SSG, Cayman - 9 Feb 2019: Cayman 58 Guyana 14 (Americas Rugby Challenge - Play Off)
 
 GA, USA - 8 July 2018: USA South 25 Cayman 12 (RAN Northern Division Final)

 Cayman - 23 June 2018: Cayman V Trinidad & Tobago (Big Game 10) - game conceded by Trinidad and Cayman announced as the winners

 Cayman - 9 June 2018: Cayman 20 Bermuda 19 (Big Game 9)

 Cayman - 17 June 2017: Cayman 39 Mexico 17 (Big Game 8)
 
 Bermuda - 3 June 2017: Bermuda 15 Cayman 28 (RAN Northern Division)

 GA, USA - 14 May 2017: USA South 34 Cayman 5 (RAN Northern Division)
 
 Dos Rios, Mexico - 2 July 2016: Mexico 34 Cayman 24 (RAN Northern Division)

 Cayman - 18 June 2016: Cayman 47 Bermuda 11 (Big Game 7) 

 FL, USA - 11 June 2016: USA South 21 Cayman 28 (Friendly)
  
 Cayman - 21 May 2016: Cayman 20 Bahamas 8 (Big Game 6) 
 
 Cayman - 11 April 2015: Cayman 3 Mexico 24 (Big Game 5)
 
 GA, USA - 21 March 2015: USA South 24 Cayman 25

 Cayman - 14 June 2014: Cayman 30 USA South 34 (Big Game 4)
 
 Cayman - 7 June 2014: Cayman 24 Bermuda 3 (Big Game 3)
 
 Freeport, Bahamas - 3 May 2014: Bahamas 7 Cayman 35 

 Cayman - 1 June 2013: Cayman 20 Bermuda 14 (Big Game 2)

 GA, USA - 7 May 2013: USA South 9 Cayman 7

 Cayman - 15 May 2012: Cayman 27 Bahamas 7 (Big Game 1)
 
 SSG, Cayman - 2 January 2012: Cayman 18 USA South 15 (Under 22 Fixture)

World Cup record
 1987 - No qualifying tournament held
 1991 - 1999 - Did not enter
 2003 - 2019 - Did not qualify

Squad

Previous squads
Test debut *

See also
 Rugby union in the Cayman Islands
 Cayman Islands national rugby union team (sevens)
 Cayman Islands women's national rugby union team

References

External links
 Cayman Rugby
 Cayman Islands at IRB Official Site
 Cayman Islands  on RugbyData.com
 Cayman Islands Official Games

Caribbean national rugby union teams
Rugby union in the Cayman Islands
Rugby union
1976 establishments in the Cayman Islands